Liviu Prunaru (born 1969 in Craiova) is a Romanian violinist. He serves as the Royal Concertgebouw Orchestra's concertmaster together with Vesko Eschkenazy.

Competition record
 1991 Rodolfo Lipizer IVC, Gorizia - 1st prize.
 1992 C. Flesch IVC, London - 4th prize.
 1993 Queen Elisabeth IMC, Brussels - 2nd prize.
 1997 Seoul IMC - 1st prize (ex-aequo with Ju-Young Baek) 
 1998 Indianapolis IVC - 2nd prize 
 1999 Juilliard Mendelssohn IVC - 1st prize 
Violinist Liviu Prunaru has won the top prizes and gained international recognition at the
most prestigious International Violin Competitions in the world. Mr. Prunaru was the 1997
Gold Medallist of the Dong-A International Violin Competition in Korea, Silver Medallist
of the 1998 Indianapolis International Violin Competition in the USA, Silver (2nd Grand
Prize) Medallist at the 1993 Queen Elizabeth in Brussels, Gold Medallist at the 1991 Rodolfo
Lipizer International Violin Competition in Italy, and Gold Medallist at the R. Molinari Violin
Competition in Switzerland, among many others.
Mr. Prunaru made his New York City debut with the Juilliard Symphony in Lincoln
Center’s Alice Tully Hall after capturing the 1st grand prize in the Juilliard Mendelssohn
Competition. Also in 1999, Mr. Prunaru won the 1st grand prize at the E. Nakamichi
Wieniawski Violin Concerto Competition resulting in performances with the Aspen Young
Artists Orchestra.
Mr. Prunaru has been featured as a soloist with: Concertgebouw Amsterdam,
the Royal Philharmonic Orchestra, the London Symphony Orchestra, Belgium National
Orchestra, Westdeutsche Sinfonia, Athens Philharmonic Orchestra, Bari Symphony
Orchestra, Bucharest Radio-Symphony Orchestra, Orchestra Mayo of Buenos Aires,
Indianapolis Chamber Orchestra, the Meridian Symphony, Mississippi Symphony, the
Juilliard Symphony, and the Puchon Philharmonic Orchestra in Korea among many others.
Mr. Prunaru has collaborated with many renowned conductors including Lord Yehudi
Menuhin, Fabio Luisi, Emmanuel Krivine, Arthur Arnold, Alexandru Lascae, Georges
Octors, Dmitri Lyss, Alexander Dimitriev, Peter Oundjian, Yuri Simonov, Andrew Litton,
Peter Braschkat, Cristian Mandeal, Lukas Vis, Horia Andreescu, Mario Benzecry, Park Eun
Seong amongst many others. Mr. Prunaru performs frequently as a soloist and in recital in all
major cities in the world.
Mr. Prunaru has performed at many prestigious Festivals including Aspen (US),
Menuhin (CH), Enescu (RO), Brussels, Buenos Aires, Wallonie, Flanders, Evian, Athens,
Incontri in Terra di Siena, Ascoli, and Salzburg Festivals.
Mr. Prunaru has recorded many CDs with Camerata Lysy, as well as his own debut
CD featuring works by Strauss, Brahms, Gluck, de Falla, Saint-Saëns, and Sarasate with
pianist Luc Devos, which is released by Pavane Records.

Born in Craiova, Romania, Mr. Prunaru began his violin studies at the age of 6 with
Professor Oprisan. His teachers: Mr.Berbec, Ms. Mihaela Mailat, Ms.Adriana Carpen and
Ms.Cornelia Bonzetti, guided him through his early years. During this period he won seven
national competitions and 1st prize at the International Kocian competition of Czechoslovakia.
Then in 1990, Mr. Prunaru was invited by violinist and Maestro Alberto Lysy to study with
him at the renowned Menuhin Academy of Gstaad, Switzerland, where he worked among
great artists like Lord Yehudi Menuhin, Igor Oistrakh, Ruggiero Ricci, Nikita Magaloff, Jean-
Pierre Rampal, Peter-Lukas Graf, and Pierre Amoyal.
Mr. Prunaru completed his professional studies with Miss Dorothy DeLay in New
York, where he also actively participated in Master Classes with Itzakh Perlman.
The Swiss record company Claves released all three violin concertos by Saint-Saëns
where violinist Liviu Prunaru is accompanied by the Ensemble Orchestral de Paris and the
distinguished conductor Lawrence Foster.
As a last addition to his discography 3 recordings came out in 2005, Beethoven's
Integral violin and piano Sonatas, with Dana Protopopescu as partner, Vivaldi's Four Seasons
with Virtuosy from Lviv, conductor Serhyi Burko and Dvořák's violin concerto with David
Angus, conductor and Symfonie Orkester of Flanders.

The 2010-2011 musical season was to include tours, recitals, concerts and Master
classes in US, Korea, Japan, China, Luxembourg, Denmark, Sweden, Norway, Austria,

France, Germany, UK, Greece, Netherlands, Belgium, Switzerland, Argentina, Spain, Italy
and Romania.

In September 2006, after 14 years of teaching at the Menuhin Academy, Liviu
Prunaru became concert master of the Royal Concertgebouw Orchestra in Amsterdam which
received, in 2008, for the first time, the title of the best orchestra in the world!

October 2010 makes another turn in Prunaru’s musical life with when he accepts to
become the musical director of International Menuhin Music Academy in Switzerland and
therefore to continue the tradition of his beloved Masters Yehudi Menuhin and Alberto Lysy!

He is playing on a Stradivari dated 1694, graciously offered by the Concertgebouw’s
board of sponsors.

“Technical mastery…he can turn a single phrase with one note…”

The Strad

“If a musical paradise exists, it must resemble the violin of Liviu Prunaru…luminous, limpid,
radiant…a single phrase suffices for the audience to hold their breath, suspended by his
bow…with this Romanian all music flows from the source effortless, with all the natural
elegance of youth…”
Le Soir

“The bow of Prunaru draws a true sonorous beauty and is rendered with exceptional ease, all
in simplicity, but with what grandeur! Luminous…a radiant seduction but at the same time, a
penetrating sensitivity.”
La Grande Fancy Fair d’Anvers

“…he possesses not only an accomplished technique and style, but also a very large
repertoire…he can play everything!”
Auxipress, Juillet Musical d’Aulnes, Belgium

“The vibrato and authenticity of Prunaru resembles that of the young Menuhin.”
Jean-Michel Molkhou, Diapason

References

1969 births
Living people
Romanian classical violinists
Male classical violinists
Prize-winners of the Queen Elisabeth Competition
Players of the Royal Concertgebouw Orchestra
21st-century classical violinists